A Great Jubilee Day, first held on Monday May 26, 1783, in North Stratford, now Trumbull, Connecticut, commemorated the end of fighting in the American Revolutionary War. This celebration included feasting, prayer, speeches, toasts, and two companies of the North Stratford militia performing maneuvers with cannon discharges and was one of the first documented celebrations following the War for Independence and continued as Decoration Day and today as Memorial Day with prayer services and a parade.

Reverend Beebe's personal reflections

North Stratford Militia
The Connecticut general assembly named Robert Hawley the Ensign of the North Stratford Train Band or Company of the 4th regiment of the Connecticut Colony militia in October 1765. He was promoted to Lieutenant in October 1769, and ultimately to Captain in May 1773. At a special meeting assembled in North Stratford on November 10, 1777, he was appointed to a committee to provide immediately all those necessaries for the Continental soldiers. On March 12, 1778, the parish of North Stratford made donations of provisions for those residents serving in the southern army stationed at Valley Forge, Pennsylvania, under the command of General George Washington. Mr. Stephen Middlebrook donated the sum of seven pounds (money), three shillings and ten pence to transport the almost two hundred pounds of provisions. George Washington called Connecticut the Provision State because of supplies contributed to his army by Governor Jonathan Trumbull the only Colonial Governor to support the cause of America's Independence from Great Britain.

See also
 Memorial Day
 Valley Forge

References

External links
The USGenWeb Project, Fairfield County

Trumbull, Connecticut
Holidays related to the American Revolution
Connecticut in the American Revolution
History of Connecticut
1783 establishments in Connecticut